Leucogyrophana is a genus of fungi in the family Hygrophoropsidaceae (suborder Coniophorineae of the order Boletales). The genus was erected in 1958 to accommodate the species then known as Merulius molluscus (as Leucogyrophana mollusca). Several more species were described, but DNA testing in 2001 found that L. mollusca was isolated genetically from the others, and most closely related instead to Hygrophoropsis.

Species
, Index Fungorum accepts 11 species of Leucogyrophana:
Leucogyrophana arizonica
Leucogyrophana hexagonoides
Leucogyrophana lichenicola
Leucogyrophana luridochracea
Leucogyrophana mollusca
Leucogyrophana olivascens
Leucogyrophana pouzarii
Leucogyrophana pseudomollusca
Leucogyrophana romellii
Leucogyrophana sororia
Leucogyrophana subtessulata

Not accepted names
 Leucogyrophana montana (Burt) Domański ==> Pseudomerulius montanus (Burt) Kotir., K.H. Larss. & M. Kulju

References

Hygrophoropsidaceae
Boletales genera